(born April 23, 1975) is a Japanese composer and sound designer. As part of FromSoftware's sound team, Hoshino is best known for composing multiple games in the Armored Core series and as the bassist and vocalist of FreQuency.

Career
Kota Hoshino was born in Tokyo, Japan on April 23, 1975, and studied at Surugadai University. Hoshino began working at FromSoftware in spring of 1998, feeling that his music would complement the games' visuals. His first role was composing music for Shadow Tower for the PlayStation. As the game uses very little music, many of Hoshino's contributions were unused, though some unused tracks were later used in Evergrace. The same year, he contributed music for Echo Night. In 1999, Hoshino composed the soundtrack of Armored Core: Master of Arena with Tsukasa Saitoh and Keiichiro Segawa, and had since written music for the series. During the FromSoftware Games Event Autumn 2018 in Osaka, Hoshino said that the game's opening theme, "Apex in Circle," was a challenging composition as it had to match the development of the intro cutscene. Hoshino stated that he cannot read music, so he usually does not compose orchestral scores. Hoshino was the composer and sound designer for Evergrace, which released in 2000 for the PlayStation 2. For the soundtrack, Hoshino used voices as the primary instrument, editing samples of his own with Sound Forge to create an "ethnic" sound, in addition to instruments including shakuhachi, shamisen, and synthesized percussion. Hoshino composed for Armored Core: Verdict Day with Yuka Kitamura, which released in 2013. Following the game's release, Hoshino worked mainly on sound design, including Sekiro: Shadows Die Twice and Elden Ring.

Hoshino is the bassist and vocalist of FreQuency, a band composed of members of FromSoftware's sound team, led with Tsukasa Saitoh. The band released songs through the FROMSOUND RECORDS label. In 2011, the band released its debut album, Armored Core Reprises, which contains arrangements of music from the Armored Core series. In 2013, the band released its second album, Sunrise, composed of original songs and arrangements. FreQuency performed Day After Day, a song for the trailer of Armored Core: Verdict Day. Following positive reception, the song alongside an instrumental version and two tracks released as an extended play of the same name in 2014. FreQuency composed and performed "Fallout," which was used for the trailer of Metal Wolf Chaos XD, a 2019 remaster of the 2004 Xbox title.

Works

References

External links

FreQuency

1975 births
Japanese composers
Japanese male composers
Living people
Musicians from Tokyo
Video game composers